Roaduvila (also spelled "Roadvila")  is a place located in Cheriyavelinallur, Karingannoor area of Velinalloor Panchayat village in the Kottarakara Taluk, Kollam District of Kerala, India. It is situated on the banks of the Ithikkara River. Post Office of Roaduvila is CHERIYAVELINALLOOR, comes under Pincode 691516. The Ayoor- Ithikkara road passes through this place. This place is 7 kilometers from Ayoor junction, and 28 kilometers from Kollam railway station.

Landmarks
The main centers of public activity in Roaduvila consist of an Engineering college,an architecture college, a Bus stand, a Petrol Pump, a primary health center (PHC), lower and upper primary schools,higher secondary school, a market, a village administrative office, a post office, a temple, Mosques, and Christian churches.

Education 
Travancore Engineering College Roaduvila 
Government L.P.School Roaduvila 
Higher Secondary School,K.P.M, HIGHER SECONDARY SCHOOL,Nizar Rahim and Mark School of Architecture, Kollam

References

External links

 
 

Kollam
Villages in Kollam district
Tourism in Kerala